"Dedicated" is a single by R. Kelly with Public Announcement, From the album Born into the 90's. The song was a top ten hit in the R&B/Hip Hop Charts and at number 31 on the Billboard Hot 100 Charts. It's the album's best charted single in the Billboard chart but the other way around in R&B/Hip Hop charts. The song was one of the songs by R. Kelly to be used in the movie Menace II Society in 1993. A music video has been made and it featured R. Kelly's mother who died a year later.

Charts

Weekly charts

Year-end charts

References

1992 singles
R. Kelly songs
1992 songs
Songs written by R. Kelly
Song recordings produced by R. Kelly
Jive Records singles